JAMESDAVIS (formerly James Davis) is an American R&B trio based in Los Angeles. It is composed of three siblings: fraternal twins Jess and Rey Reynolds and their brother Auston Reynolds. The trio has released several EPs, including most recently, Masterpeace, in May 2019. JAMESDAVIS is currently signed to Motown.

History

JAMESDAVIS is composed of fraternal twins and co-vocalists Jess and Rey Reynolds and their younger brother, producer and keyboardist Auston Reynolds. Each member of the band also sings and plays guitar, keys, and/or percussion depending on the song. Their father is a former professional baseball player and their mother a professional background singer. Jess had previously been signed to Virgin Records as a teenager and worked with songwriter, Harold Lilly. Likewise, Rey was mentored by Motown songwriter, Leon Ware. Auston also studied sound engineering.

The three began recording together as teenagers in around 2008. The group's name is a combination of the common middle name of all the men on their father's side (James) and their mother's maiden name (Davis). In around 2014, Motown president Ethiopia Habtemariam heard the group's demo and signed them to a recording contract. The trio's first Motown single, "Better Than You Are", was released in January 2015. A second single, "Co-Pilot", and its accompanying music video were released the following month. The group also released a cover of The Cranberries' song, "Zombie". In May 2015, the trio released its self-titled debut EP (James Davis) on Motown and began opening for Seinabo Sey on her U.S. tour in support. A second EP, Here It Go, was released in January 2016.

After nearly two years, the group returned in November 2017 with a mini-EP (Not The Album) and its current name stylization ("JAMESDAVIS"). In September 2018, the trio released the single, "Speedboat." The following month, that song would appear on the band's Lamplighter, Vol. 1 EP released via Motown. JAMESDAVIS also performed "Speedboat" at the Ebony Power 100 Gala in November 2018.

In 2019, the group began releasing a series of singles, including "Evergreen", "Dodger Black", and "Something To Talk About". Those songs appeared on the trio's 7-track EP, Masterpeace, released by Motown in May 2019. JAMESDAVIS also supported Leikeli47 on her North American "Acrylic" tour before playing a few shows in Europe.

Discography

EPs

Singles

References

External links
Official website

2014 establishments in California
2014 in music
Motown artists
Musical groups from Los Angeles